Uberto is an Italian first name, the equivalent of Hubert; variations include Oberto, Ubertino and female forms are Uberta, Oberta, Ubertina.

Notable people with this name include:
 Uberto Allucingoli, Italian cardinal
 Sante Uberto Barbieri, bishop of the Methodist Church
 Ubertino I da Carrara, (died 1345), Lord of Padua
 Ubertino of Casale (1259–1329), Italian Fransciscan
 Pope Urban III, born Uberto Crivelli
 Uberto Lanfranchi (died 1137), Archbishop of Pisa
 Uberto De Morpurgo (1896–1961), Austrian-born Italian tennis player
 Ubertino Pallavicini (died 1278), Margrave of Bodonitsa
 Uberto Pasolini (born 1957), Italian film producer and director
 Uberto Zanolli, Italo-Mexican composer

Italian masculine given names
Italian names of Germanic origin